1963 Emperor's Cup Final was the 43rd final of the Emperor's Cup competition. The final was played at Kobe Oji Stadium in Hyōgo on January 15, 1964. Waseda University won the championship.

Overview
Waseda University won the championship, by defeating Hitachi 3–0.

Match details

See also
1963 Emperor's Cup

References

Emperor's Cup
1963 in Japanese football
Kashiwa Reysol matches